Alan Devlin (born 2 October 1959) is a New Zealand cricketer. He played in three first-class and two List A matches for Canterbury in 1983/84.

See also
 List of Canterbury representative cricketers

References

External links
 

1959 births
Living people
New Zealand cricketers
Canterbury cricketers
Cricketers from Rangiora